Crystallization is the (natural or artificial) formation of highly organized, solid crystals.

Crystallization or Crystallize may also refer to:
 Crystallization (love), a concept defined by Stendhal
 "Crystallize" (Kylie Minogue song)
 "Crystallize" (Lindsey Stirling song)
 "Crystallized" (song), a song by Young the Giant
 "Crystalised", a song by The xx
 "Crystallised", a song by Haken from the EP Restoration